A special election was held on May 21, 2019, to fill the remainder of the term for  in the United States House of Representatives for the 116th United States Congress. Tom Marino, a Republican, resigned from office effective January 23.

Background 
As a result of the 2018 elections, Pennsylvania's House delegation to the 116th U.S. Congress took office in early January 2019 with a tie of 9 Republicans and 9 Democrats.

By state law, Governor Tom Wolf was required to call for a special election at least 60 days after the seat became vacant. Wolf set the election for May 21. Primary elections were not held in the race. Instead, nominees were chosen by each party. Republicans selected their nominee on March 2.

Republican conferee meeting

Candidates

Nominee
Fred Keller, state representative

Defeated at the convention
Jessica Bowman-Hosley, professor
Malcolm Derk, former Snyder County commissioner
Kevin Ferrara, veteran
Stacy Garrity, businesswoman
Davis C. Haire, doctor
Chris Hoffman, vice president of the Pennsylvania Farm Bureau
Matthew McDermott
Doug McLinko, Bradford County commissioner and candidate for Pennsylvania's 12th congressional district in 2018
Patrick Miller, law student
Maria Montero
Joseph Moralez, vice president of a statewide nursing agency
Robert Noerr, former National Debate Tournament qualifier
Joseph Peters, former state deputy attorney general and candidate for Pennsylvania's 8th congressional district in 2018

Withdrawn
Christopher Bain
James Canning, businessman and constable
Gerald Carlin, businessman
Brian Fuller, activist
Bobby Jeffries
Dale McElhattan
Chuck Risio
Matthew Timm
Jeff Wheeland, state representative
Matthew Zeigler, lawyer

Declined to run
Lou Barletta, former U.S. Representative and nominee for U.S. Senate in 2018
Jake Corman, majority leader of the Pennsylvania State Senate
Keith Eckel, former president of the State Farm Bureau
Jonathan Fritz, state representative
Davis C. Haire
Sandra Major, former state representative
Tony Mussare, Lycoming County commissioner
Michael Peifer, state representative
Mario Scavello, state senator
Jeff Stroehmann, businessman
Dave Weber, district director for outgoing U.S. Representative Tom Marino
Eugene Yaw, state senator

Democratic selection
According to the Pennsylvania Democratic Party, Marc Friedenberg, the Democratic nominee for the district in 2018, was the only individual who submitted an application to be the nominee. Therefore, the convention was cancelled, and the party declared Friedenberg the nominee on February 12.

General election

Endorsements

Debates

Fundraising

Results

See also
List of special elections to the United States House of Representatives

References

External links
Official campaign websites
Marc Friedenberg (D) for Congress 
Fred Keller (R) for Congress

Pennsylvania 12
Pennsylvania 2019 12
United States House of Representatives 12
2019 12
Pennsylvania 2019 12
United States House of Representatives 2019 12
Pennsylvania's 12th congressional district special election